Theobald I (913–975), called the Trickster (known as le Tricheur –meaning “cheater”– in French), was first Viscount of Blois and Viscount of Tours, and then from 956, Count of Blois, Chartres and Châteaudun, as well as Count of Tours.

Life
Theobald I was the son of Theobald the Elder of Blois, who from 908 on was Viscomte of Tours.  The Elder's wife, the mother of Theobald I, was Richende De Bourges, a great-granddaughter of Rorgon I, Count of Maine. Theobald I was initially a vassal of Hugh the Great, Duke of France. Around 945, Louis IV was captured by Northmen and given over to Hugh the Great, who placed the king in Theobald's custody. After about a year in his vassal's custody, King Louis negotiated his freedom by offering Hugh the city of Laon, which Hugh then gave to Theobald. Theobald was the Count of Tours from 942, was also Count of Blois and in 960, Count of Châteaudun and Chartres.

Theobald's sister Adelaide had married Alan II of Nantes, the Duke of Brittany, giving Theobald influence all the way to Rennes. However, the death of Alan II left a void in Brittany, making it vulnerable to encroachment by either the Normans or the Angevins. Theobald made an alliance with Fulk II of Anjou, which gave him control of Saumur, a strategic citadel located between the rivers Loire and Thouet, guarding the Angevin march. This included control of the monastery of Saint-Florent, inside the walls of Saumur. In turn, the recently widowed Fulk married Theobald's sister, the widow of Alan II of Nantes.

In 960, he began opposing Richard I of Normandy and entered into a long war with the Normans. In 961 he attacked Évreux. The Normans responded by attacking Dunois. In 962, he launched an assault on Rouen, which attack failed. The Normans burned Chartres in response. He took control of the fortresses of Saint-Aignan in the Loir-et-Cher, Vierzon, and Anguillon in Berry. During the minority of Hugh Capet, he reinforced Chartres and Châteaudun, as well as founding the Château de Chinon. By the time of his death, he had built a vast power on the Loire, dominating central France.

About 943–44, he married Luitgarde of Vermandois, widow of William I of Normandy. She was the daughter of Herbert II, Count of Vermandois and Hildebrand of France, daughter of King Robert I of France. Her half-brother was Hugh the Great, Duke of France.

Family
His wife Luitgarde of Vermandois bore him:
 Theobald (d. 962).
 Hugh, Archbishop of Bourges (d. 985).
 Odo (d. 995), succeeded his father as Count of Blois
 Hildegarde, married Bouchard de Bray, Lord of Montmorency.
 Emma (d. aft. 1003), married William IV of Aquitaine.

Notes

References

Sources

65

Counts of Tours
Counts of Blois
Counts of Chartres
Counts of Châteaudun
913 births
975 deaths
Year of birth uncertain
Year of death uncertain
House of Blois